David Brook may refer to:
David Brook (songwriter) (born 1987), American songwriter
 David Broke  (c. 1498–1560), English judge and member of parliament using various spellings

See also
 David Brooke (disambiguation)
 David Brooks (disambiguation)